Ken Yonker (born December 16, 1956) is an American politician and businessman who served as a member of the Michigan House of Representatives from 2011 to 2017. A graduate of Michigan State University, Yonker is the founder and owner of Yonker's Landscaping and was a manager for a local construction company. He worked with Wycliffe Bible Translators.

In 2017, Yonker was disciplined for using his county vehicle for personal reasons to oppose a local ballot proposal.

References

1956 births
Politicians from Grand Rapids, Michigan
Living people
Michigan State University alumni
Michigan Republicans
21st-century American politicians
People from Kent County, Michigan